Aleksandar Srećković (born 25 June 1981) is a Serbian football defender.

During his career, he had already played in the Serbian top league club FK Radnički Obrenovac, in Serbian lower league clubs FK Sinđelić Beograd, FK Čukarički, FK Beograd, OFK Niš, FK Mačva Šabac, FK BASK, FK Sevojno and FK ČSK Čelarevo, but also with Romanian club CFR Timişoara and Albanian FK Apolonia Fier.

External links
 Profile and stats at Srbijafudbal
 

1981 births
Living people
Footballers from Belgrade
Serbian footballers
Serbian expatriate footballers
Association football defenders
FK Radnički Obrenovac players
FK Čukarički players
FK Mačva Šabac players
FK BASK players
FK Sevojno players
FK ČSK Čelarevo players
FK Srem players
KF Apolonia Fier players
Expatriate footballers in Albania
Serbian expatriate sportspeople in Albania